Tell Safouk is a town in southern al-Hasakah Governorate, northeastern Syria.

Administratively the village belongs to the Nahiya Markada of al-Hasakah District. At the 2004 census, it had a population of 5,781.

References

Populated places in al-Hasakah District